Bonnetiaceae is a family of flowering plants, consisting of 4 genera and 41 species. The family is Neotropical, with the exception of the genus Ploiarium, which is found in Malesia. It is sister to the family Clusiaceae.

References

 
Malpighiales families